Adam Marshall (born 1984) is an Australian politician for the National Party of Australia.

Adam Marshall may also refer to:

 Adam Marshall (priest) (1785–1825), American Jesuit priest

See also
 Adam Marshall Diston (1893–1956), Scottish journalist
 
 Marshall (name)